The Institute of Advanced Study (IAS) is an interdisciplinary research centre of Durham University. The IAS - set up to mark Durham's 175th anniversary - is intended to attract scholars and public figures from across the world to collaborate on 'agenda-setting research'. It is housed in the Grade II* listed Bishop Cosin's Hall, an early 18th century building on Palace Green, Durham, within the Durham UNESCO World Heritage Site. The Institute accepted its first fellows in January 2006 and was formally inaugurated into the university in October that year.

Mission 
The goal of the IAS, in the university's own words, is to 'offer world-leading researchers a unique space for transformative reflection in and beyond individual disciplines'. Fellows selected by the university advance their own research, engage with academic departments, deliver public lectures and seminars, and contribute to research projects across the university.

IAS activity is based around research projects across the Sciences, Social Sciences and Humanities. These projects are chosen to provide an interdisciplinary perspective on important questions. Each theme of the IAS's research is published a year in advance. For the inaugural theme in 2006-2007 the university selected the "Legacy of Darwin" as a way of exploring the impact of Darwinian thought on multiple academic subjects. The theme for the 2017/18 fellowships is the concept of 'Structure'.

Publications 

The institute publishes the e-journal 'Insights'. Articles are contributed by fellows and designed to reflect the thinking developed during their time at Durham. These papers take the form of thought experiments, summaries of research findings, theoretical statements, original reviews, and 'occasionally more fully worked treatises'. The IAS is also responsible for 'Kaleidoscope', a multidisciplinary open access peer-reviewed journal edited by postgraduate researchers. Each volume reflects the annual theme of the IAS.

Fellowships 
The IAS offers fellowships to UK and international scholars. The Fellowships each last three months, with two cohorts of 10 participants joining in January and October. Applicants may be from any academic discipline or professional background, though preference is given to those applying from overseas.

Each fellow becomes a member of one of the university's colleges. As well as accommodation, college membership also entails inclusion with the Senior Common Room and access to formal dinners and events. Every IAS Fellow, regardless of college affiliation, also receives honorary membership of the University College Senior Common Room and the right to take occasional meals at the college.

Apart from the fellowships offered by the IAS, fellowships of approximately a term are offered by some of the colleges, with the potential to become an IAS affiliate:
Collingwood College - Collingwood College Fellowships
Grey College - Sidney Holgate Research Fellowship, Alan Richards Mathematics Fellowships, and the Winifred Jean Stubbs Fellowship for Oriental Studies and theology
Hatfield College - Visiting Research Fellowship
 St Aidan's College - St Aidan's College Fellowship
St Chad's College - The Traidcraft Fellowship, Senior Research Fellowships, Durham Cathedral Artist in Residence and the Alan Richardson Fellowship
St John’s College - St John's College Visiting Fellowship and the Ruth Etchells Fellowship
St Mary’s College
 Trevelyan College - The Trevelyan Fellowship and the Sir William Luce Fellowship in Middle Eastern Studies.
University College - Leonard Slater Fellowship and the Pemberton Fellowship
Van Mildert College - Arthur Prowse Fellowship & the Arnold Bradshaw Fellowship

Directorate 
The IAS is run by four directors nominally appointed by the Vice-Chancellor of the university. The directors are responsible for the academic calendar and research events of the IAS. Three of the directors are responsible for maintaining links with the IAS and are thus named after the relevant faculty.

Advisory Council 
The advisory council works alongside the directors. It meets once a year to develop the academic calendar of the IAS and aid in its promotion through members acting as ambassadors to the IAS and advising on new research themes. The council consists of representatives from Durham University, and from other universities from across Britain and overseas.

See also 
 Radcliffe Institute for Advanced Study
 Institute for Advanced Study
 Some Institutes for Advanced Study
 Institute for Advanced Study, Berlin

References

External links 
IAS homepage
Industry Review Article
THS Article on IAS

2006 establishments in England
Durham University
Research institutes in County Durham
Multidisciplinary research institutes